West Clermont High School (abbreviated WCHS) is a public co-ed high school in Union Township, Clermont County, Ohio, United States. It is the West Clermont Local School District's only high school, due to the 2017 merger of Amelia and Glen Este high schools. WCHS is a suburban area located west of Batavia.

References

External links
 
 District website

High schools in Clermont County, Ohio
Education in Cincinnati
Public high schools in Ohio
Educational institutions established in 2017
2017 establishments in Ohio